William Henry Cooper (11 September 1849 – 5 April 1939) was an English-born Australian cricketer who played in two Test matches, one in each of 1881 and 1884. He took six wickets on debut in the second innings against England in Melbourne in 1882.

Born and raised in Kent, he came to Australia as an adult and did not start playing competitive cricket until the age of 27.  He returned to England as part of Billy Murdoch's 1884 tour.

A handy leg-break bowler, he was also noted for his services to Victorian Cricket where after his playing days he served as a state selector and later as vice president of the Victorian Cricket Association.

His great-grandson, Paul Sheahan, also played Test cricket for Australia.

References

External links

1849 births
1939 deaths
Australia Test cricketers
Victoria cricketers
Australian cricketers
Cricketers who have taken five wickets on Test debut
Sportspeople from Maidstone
English emigrants to Australia